Youxin Subdistrict is a former subdistrict of Gusu District, Suzhou, Jiangsu, China. The subdistrict was abolished on March 24, 2017 when it was merged into Wumenqiao Subdistrict.

Administrative divisions 
In 2016, before its abolition, Youxin Subdistrict administered the following 14 residential communities:

 Guxiang Community
 Fuxing First Community
 Xinkang First Community
 Youlian First Community
 Youlian Second Community
 Youlian Third Community
 Xiangya Community
 Meiting Community
 Sijijinghua Community
 Xinguo Community
 Youlian Community
 Shuangqiao Community
 Canglang Xincheng Community
 Fuyun Community

See also
List of township-level divisions of Suzhou
Wumenqiao Subdistrict

References

Gusu District

Former township-level divisions of Suzhou